Albert Heber Longman (24 June 1880 – 16 February 1954), also often referred to as Heber Longman or Heber Albert Longman, was an Australian newspaper publisher and museum director of British origin.

Early years
Longman was born at Heytesbury in Wiltshire, England, and educated at Emwell House School at Warminster. Because of a chest weakness, in 1902 he emigrated to Australia and settled in Toowoomba, Queensland. There he, with support from local businesses, established a newspaper first called the Rag, and later the Citizen. In 1904 he married Irene Maud Bayley, who was to be the first woman elected to the Queensland Parliament. Interested in the natural history of the area, Longman collected botanical specimens and helped establish the local field naturalists club. In 1911 he published a book – The Religion of a Naturalist – expressing his philosophical position as an agnostic.

Queensland Museum
In 1911 Longman moved to Brisbane to take up a position as a member of the staff of the Queensland Museum, rising to become Acting Director in 1917 and Director in 1918. There the main focus of his interests turned from botany to zoology, especially vertebrate paleontology, describing new genera of fish, marine reptiles, dinosaurs and a marsupial. He wished to make the Museum more of an educational institution, rather than a repository of fossils. He acquired for the Museum several dinosaur skeletons, including the Rhoesaurus Brownei.

He published approximately 70 papers which appeared in the Memoirs of the Queensland Museum. He also wrote a popular column – Nature’s ways – in the Brisbane Courier-Mail. He retired from the museum in 1945 and died at his home in Brisbane in 1954. He was survived by his wife Irene Longman.

Honours and awards
 President, Royal Society of Queensland (1919, 1939)
 President, Queensland Naturalists' Club
 Vice-chairman, Great Barrier Reef Committee
 Member, Australian National Research Council
 Fellow, Linnean Society of London
 Fellow, Royal Anthropological Institute of Great Britain and Ireland
 Corresponding member, Zoological Society of London
 1946 –  Australian Natural History Medallion
 1952 – Mueller Medal

References

1880 births
1954 deaths
People from Wiltshire
English emigrants to Australia
People from Brisbane
Australian naturalists
Australian paleontologists
Directors of museums in Australia
20th-century naturalists